Berliner-Joyce Aircraft was an American aircraft manufacturer.

History 
The company was founded on the February 4, 1929, when Henry Berliner and his 1922 company, Berliner Aircraft Company of Alexandria, Virginia, joined with Maryland Aviation Commission leader Captain Temple Nach Joyce.

Berliner-Joyce hired William H. Miller as chief designer, and opened a 58,000 square foot factory in Dundalk, Maryland, near Logan Field. The facility operated one of the largest private Wind tunnel operations of the time. The Great Depression ended the civil aircraft production market, so Berliner-Joyce concentrated on designing aircraft for the USAAC and US Navy.

In May 1929 the company received its first order, for the Berliner-Joyce XFJ. Other projects, the P-16 and OJ-2, also received orders. A merger between the Douglas Aircraft Company and Berliner Joyce was proposed in early 1930, but fell through. Later that same year, North American Aviation bought the company. Later, in 1933, the since renamed B-J Corporation became a subsidiary of a subsidiary when North American Aviation was purchased by General Motors Corporation. In January 1934 Joyce left the company to join Bellanca Aircraft, and soon after Berliner left for Engineering and Research Corporation. The company was then moved from Maryland to Inglewood, California.

Aircraft

References

Notes

Bibliography
 

Defunct aircraft manufacturers of the United States
Vehicle manufacturing companies established in 1929
North American Aviation
Aviation in Maryland
1929 establishments in Maryland
Vehicle manufacturing companies disestablished in 1933
1933 disestablishments in Maryland